The 1980 Avon Championships of Cincinnati was a women's tennis tournament played on indoor carpet courts at the Riverfront Coliseum in Cincinnati, Ohio in the United States that was part of the 1980 Avon Championships Circuit. It was the inaugural edition of the tournament and was held from January 7 through January 13, 1980. Second-seeded Tracy Austin won the singles title and earned $30,000 first-prize money.

Finals

Singles
 Tracy Austin defeated  Chris Evert-Lloyd 6–2, 6–1
 It was Austin's first singles title of the year and the 11th of her career.

Doubles
 Laura DuPont /  Pam Shriver defeated  Mima Jaušovec /  Ann Kiyomura 6–3, 6–3

Prize money

References

External links
 International Tennis Federation (ITF) tournament edition details

Avon Championships of Cincinnati
Avon Championships of Cincinnati
1980 in sports in Ohio